Ab Bad (also Romanized as Āb Bād; also known as Āb Bār) is a village in Hur Rural District, in the Central District of Faryab County, Kerman Province, Iran. At the 2006 census, its population was 219, in 52 families.

References 

Populated places in Faryab County